Kana Supplement is a Unicode block containing one archaic katakana character and 255 hentaigana (non-standard Hiragana) characters. Additional hentaigana characters are encoded in the Kana Extended-A block.

Block

History
The following Unicode-related documents record the purpose and process of defining specific characters in the Kana Supplement block:

See also 
 Hiragana (Unicode block)
 Katakana (Unicode block)
 Kana Extended-A (Unicode block)
 Kana Extended-B (Unicode block)
 Small Kana Extension (Unicode block)

References 

Unicode blocks